Lucius P. Buchanan House, also known as the Ralph L. Gray Alumni Center of Missouri Southern State University, is a historic home located at Joplin, Jasper County, Missouri.  It was built in 1926, and is a two-story, Spanish Revival style masonry dwelling covered in protective stucco.  It has a low-pitched tiled gable roof and features multiple arched entryways and window frames, recessed porch, decorative ornamentation, and wrought iron embellishments.  The prominent landscape architects Hare & Hare laid out the gardens, swimming pool and extended grounds.

It was listed on the National Register of Historic Places in 2012.

References

Houses on the National Register of Historic Places in Missouri
Mission Revival architecture in Missouri
Houses completed in 1926
Buildings and structures in Joplin, Missouri
National Register of Historic Places in Jasper County, Missouri